CMA CGM Zheng He is an Explorer class containership built for CMA CGM. It is among the world's largest containerships, at 16,020 TEU.

The ship was built by Shanghai Jiangnan Changxing Heavy Industry, the same shipyard that built sister ship CMA CGM Benjamin Franklin. At the time of its launch it was the longest ship built on hull in China.

It is the second CMA CGM ship to be named for Zheng He as CMA CGM Marco Polo was originally named for the Chinese explorer.

References

Zheng He
Zheng He
2015 ships